Dodd may refer to:

Places
Dodd (Buttermere), a fell near Red Pike in England
Dodd (Lake District), a fell in Cumbria, England
Dodd, Indiana, a community in the United States

People
Dodd (surname), people with the surname Dodd

Other uses
Dodd (hill), a British hill categorisation
Dodd, Mead and Company, publishing company
 Dodd Hall, a building at Florida State University
Dodd-Frank Street Reform and Consumer Protection Act (Pub.L. 111–203, H.R. 4173), commonly referred to as "Dodd–Frank", a U.S. federal government law passed as a response to the Great Recession

See also
 DOD (disambiguation)
 Dodds (disambiguation)
 Doddy (disambiguation)